The France women's national under-19 football team represents France at UEFA Women's Under-19 Championship and FIFA U-20 Women's World Cup. Their first achievement was winning the 2003 UEFA Women's Under-19 Championship. They have then won four more UEFA Women's U-19 European Championships in 2010, 2013, 2016 and 2019. France hosted the FIFA U-20 Women's World Cup in 2018.

Fixtures and results

 Legend

2022

 
Fixtures and results (France Under 20)

Players

Current U19 squad
The following players were named in the squad for 2022 UEFA Women's Under-19 Championship.

Caps and goals are correct as of 6 July 2022, after the match against Norway.

Current U20 squad
The following players were named in the squad for 2022 FIFA U-20 Women's World Cup.

Caps and goals are correct as of 17 August 2022, after the match against South Korea.

Competitive record

FIFA U-20 Women's World Cup
The French team has participated in 8 tournaments. The best result was Runners-up (2016).

UEFA Women's Under-19 Championship
The French team has participated in the UEFA Women's Under-19 Championship 18 times; Winning it five times (2003, 2010, 2013, 2016 and 2019)

See also
 France women's national football team
 France women's national under-17 football team

References

External links
 Under-19 page at FFF 
 Under-20 page at FFF 

Women's national under-19 association football teams
under
European women's national under-19 association football teams]